Royal is a village in Champaign County, Illinois, United States. The population was 293 at the 2020 census.

Geography
Royal is located at  (40.193408, -87.973189).

Demographics

As of the 2020 census there were 293 people, 149 households, and 101 families residing in the village. The racial makeup of the village was 95.56% White, 0.34% African American, 0.68% Asian, 0.68% from other races, and 2.73% from two or more races. Hispanic or Latino of any race were 0.68% of the population.

There were 149 households, out of which 51.01% had children under the age of 18 living with them, 57.05% were married couples living together, 10.07% had a female householder with no husband present, and 32.21% were non-families. 29.53% of all households were made up of individuals, and 18.79% had someone living alone who was 65 years of age or older. The average household size was 3.04 and the average family size was 2.48.

The village's age distribution consisted of 21.9% under the age of 18, 8.9% from 18 to 24, 23.7% from 25 to 44, 22.1% from 45 to 64, and 23.2% who were 65 years of age or older. The median age was 40.4 years. For every 100 females, there were 94.7 males. For every 100 females age 18 and over, there were 81.8 males.

The median income for a household in the village was $75,750, and the median income for a family was $91,750. Males had a median income of $46,250 versus $32,188 for females. The per capita income for the village was $35,455. About 4.0% of families and 5.7% of the population were below the poverty line, including 14.8% of those under age 18 and 1.2% of those age 65 or over.

History

Royal, Illinois is a small village that in part consists of grain elevators at the intersection of a railroad and County Road 20.

Nearly a hundred years ago, the people of St. John Lutheran Church decided to move their church building into town, to better serve current and future generations of people in the village of Royal.  Not everyone initially wanted to move the church building; the vote to move was narrowly split.  Nonetheless, having made the decision, the congregation came together and embraced the vision for a ministry within the village of Royal. The people worked together for many hours to move their church home. The men and boys of the congregation carefully deconstructed the church, brick by brick, and transported the bricks from out in the country into the village of Royal. There, the congregation's women and older men painstakingly cleaned the mortar from the bricks to provide the building blocks for a new St. John Lutheran Church to serve the people of Royal. The church still stands today, with 831 members and an average attendance of 200 people.

In 1982, around the time of the town's centennial anniversary, people began to talk to one another about constructing a shared Community Building to benefit the current and future people of Royal. Hearkening back to the example of the members of St. John's, the wider community came together around the shared vision of a community of people living together. This vision was embodied in the concept of a Community Building.

An apartment building in Champaign, Illinois needed to be demolished. Hearkening back to the example of the people of St. John Lutheran, the people gathered the bricks and worked together to clean the mortar from each brick. The people then built the new Community Building with these bricks, and it was completed the year after the centennial. The building still stands today and is used by the people of Royal for personal and public events for as little as $85.00 for a small group.

References

External links

Government
ChampaignCountyClerk.com. Village of Royal elected officials.
DexKnows. Location of election polling place.
United States Postal Service. Location of post office.

Demographics
ZipAtlas. Cities with the highest percentage of Germans in Illinois.
CityData.com. Demographic statistics for Royal.

Education
Prairieview-Ogden Schools. Home webpage for the elementary and junior high school.

Houses of Worship
St. John Lutheran Church.

Seniors
FamilyService.org. Royal Senior Citizen Social Group information page.

Villages in Champaign County, Illinois
Villages in Illinois